The 2010–11 Cypriot Third Division was the 40th season of the Cypriot third-level football league. Ethnikos Assia won their 1st title.

Format
Fourteen teams participated in the 2010–11 Cypriot Third Division. All teams played against each other twice, once at their home and once away. The team with the most points at the end of the season crowned champions. The first three teams were promoted to the 2011–12 Cypriot Second Division and the last three teams were relegated to the 2011–12 Cypriot Fourth Division.

Point system
Teams received three points for a win, one point for a draw and zero points for a loss.

Changes from previous season
Teams promoted to 2010–11 Cypriot Second Division
 Chalkanoras Idaliou
 Anagennisi Deryneia
 Adonis Idaliou

Teams relegated from 2009–10 Cypriot Second Division
 Frenaros FC
 Ayia Napa
 MEAP Nisou

Teams promoted from 2009–10 Cypriot Fourth Division
 Enosis Neon Parekklisia
 Nikos & Sokratis Erimis
 Anagennisi Germasogeias

Teams relegated to 2010–11 Cypriot Fourth Division
 THOI Lakatamia
 Kissos Kissonergas
 Achyronas Liopetriou

Stadia and locations

League standings

Results

See also
 Cypriot Third Division
 2010–11 Cypriot First Division
 2010–11 Cypriot Cup for lower divisions

Sources

Cypriot Third Division seasons
Cyprus
2010–11 in Cypriot football